The Gualaxo do Sul River is a river of Minas Gerais state in southeastern Brazil. It is a tributary of the Do Carmo River.

See also
 List of rivers of Minas Gerais

References
 Map from Ministry of Transport
 Rand McNally, The New International Atlas, 1993.

Rivers of Minas Gerais